Lauri Johannes Silván (born 13 March 1932) is a Finnish ice hockey player. He competed in the men's tournament at the 1952 Winter Olympics.

References

External links

1932 births
Living people
Ice hockey players at the 1952 Winter Olympics
Ice hockey people from Tampere
Olympic ice hockey players of Finland